The 1901 Milwaukee Brewers were an American professional baseball team. The Brewers finished eighth in the inaugural season of the American League with a record of 48 wins and 89 losses,  games behind the Chicago White Stockings. After the season, the major-league franchise relocated from Milwaukee to St. Louis and became the St. Louis Browns, where they remained through the 1953 season. A franchise in the minor-league American Association played in Milwaukee from 1902 through 1952 using the Milwaukee Brewers name.

Offseason 
 March 23, 1901: Tom Leahy was signed as a free agent by the Brewers.

Regular season

Regular season highlights 
4/24/01:  In the first game of the season in Detroit, the Brewers held a 13-4 lead going into the 9th inning. The Detroit Tigers scored 10 runs in the bottom of the inning to win, a record which still stands as the greatest 9th inning comeback in major league baseball history.

Season standings

Record vs. opponents

Notable transactions 
 June 1901: Tom Leahy was released by the Brewers.

Roster

Player stats

Batting

Starters by position 
Note: Pos = Position; G = Games played; AB = At bats; H = Hits; Avg. = Batting average; HR = Home runs; RBI = Runs batted in

Other batters 
Note: G = Games played; AB = At bats; H = Hits; Avg. = Batting average; HR = Home runs; RBI = Runs batted in

Pitching

Starting pitchers 
Note: G = Games pitched; IP = Innings pitched; W = Wins; L = Losses; ERA = Earned run average; SO = Strikeouts

Other pitchers 
Note: G = Games pitched; IP = Innings pitched; W = Wins; L = Losses; ERA = Earned run average; SO = Strikeouts

Notes

References 
1901 Milwaukee Brewers team page at Baseball Reference
1901 Milwaukee Brewers season at baseball-almanac.com

Baltimore Orioles seasons
Milwaukee Brewers Season, 1901
Inaugural Major League Baseball seasons by team
1901 in sports in Wisconsin